Naturally occurring rhodium (45Rh) is composed of only one stable isotope, 103Rh. The most stable radioisotopes are 101Rh with a half-life of 3.3 years, 102Rh with a half-life of 207 days, and 99Rh with a half-life of 16.1 days. Thirty other radioisotopes have been characterized with atomic weights ranging from 88.949 u (89Rh) to 121.943 u (122Rh). Most of these have half-lives that are less than an hour except 100Rh (half-life: 20.8 hours) and 105Rh (half-life: 35.36 hours). There are also numerous meta states with the most stable being 102mRh (0.141 MeV) with a half-life of about 3.7 years and 101mRh (0.157 MeV) with a half-life of 4.34 days.

The primary decay mode before the only stable isotope, 103Rh, is electron capture and the primary mode after is beta emission. The primary decay product before 103Rh is ruthenium and the primary product after is palladium.

List of isotopes 

|-
| 89Rh
| style="text-align:right" | 45
| style="text-align:right" | 44
| 88.94884(48)#
| 10# ms[>1.5 μs]
| β+
| 89Ru
| 7/2+#
|
|
|-
| 90Rh
| style="text-align:right" | 45
| style="text-align:right" | 45
| 89.94287(54)#
| 15(7) ms[12(+9−4) ms]
| β+
| 90Ru
| 0+#
|
|
|-
| style="text-indent:1em" | 90mRh
| colspan="3" style="text-indent:2em" | 0(500)# keV
| 1.1(3) s[1.0(+3−2) s]
|
|
| 9+#
|
|
|-
| 91Rh
| style="text-align:right" | 45
| style="text-align:right" | 46
| 90.93655(43)#
| 1.74(14) s
| β+
| 91Ru
| 7/2+#
|
|
|-
| style="text-indent:1em" | 91mRh
| colspan="3" style="text-indent:2em" |
| 1.46(11) s
|
|
| (1/2−)
|
|
|-
| 92Rh
| style="text-align:right" | 45
| style="text-align:right" | 47
| 91.93198(43)#
| 4.3(13) s
| β+
| 92Ru
| (6+)
|
|
|-
| style="text-indent:1em" | 92mRh
| colspan="3" style="text-indent:2em" |
| 4.66(25) s[2.9(+15−8) s]
|
|
| (≥6+)
|
|
|-
| 93Rh
| style="text-align:right" | 45
| style="text-align:right" | 48
| 92.92574(43)#
| 11.9(7) s
| β+
| 93Ru
| 9/2+#
|
|
|-
| rowspan=2|94Rh
| rowspan=2 style="text-align:right" | 45
| rowspan=2 style="text-align:right" | 49
| rowspan=2|93.92170(48)#
| rowspan=2|70.6(6) s
| β+ (98.2%)
| 94Ru
| rowspan=2|(2+, 4+)
| rowspan=2|
| rowspan=2|
|-
| β+, p (1.79%)
| 93Tc
|-
| style="text-indent:1em" | 94mRh
| colspan="3" style="text-indent:2em" | 300(200)# keV
| 25.8(2) s
| β+
| 94Ru
| (8+)
| 
| 
|-
| 95Rh
| style="text-align:right" | 45
| style="text-align:right" | 50
| 94.91590(16)
| 5.02(10) min
| β+
| 95Ru
| (9/2)+
|
|
|-
| rowspan=2 style="text-indent:1em" | 95mRh
| rowspan=2 colspan="3" style="text-indent:2em" | 543.3(3) keV
| rowspan=2|1.96(4) min
| IT (88%)
| 95Rh
| rowspan=2|(1/2)−
| rowspan=2|
| rowspan=2|
|-
| β+ (12%)
| 95Ru
|-
| 96Rh
| style="text-align:right" | 45
| style="text-align:right" | 51
| 95.914461(14)
| 9.90(10) min
| β+
| 96Ru
| (6+)
|
|
|-
| rowspan=2 style="text-indent:1em" | 96mRh
| rowspan=2 colspan="3" style="text-indent:2em" | 52.0(1) keV
| rowspan=2|1.51(2) min
| IT (60%)
| 96Rh
| rowspan=2|(3+)
| rowspan=2|
| rowspan=2|
|-
| β+ (40%)
| 96Ru
|-
| 97Rh
| style="text-align:right" | 45
| style="text-align:right" | 52
| 96.91134(4)
| 30.7(6) min
| β+
| 97Ru
| 9/2+
|
|
|-
| rowspan=2 style="text-indent:1em" | 97mRh
| rowspan=2 colspan="3" style="text-indent:2em" | 258.85(17) keV
| rowspan=2|46.2(16) min
| β+ (94.4%)
| 97Ru
| rowspan=2|1/2−
| rowspan=2|
| rowspan=2|
|-
| IT (5.6%)
| 97Rh
|-
| 98Rh
| style="text-align:right" | 45
| style="text-align:right" | 53
| 97.910708(13)
| 8.72(12) min
| β+
| 98Ru
| (2)+
|
|
|-
| rowspan=2 style="text-indent:1em" | 98mRh
| rowspan=2 colspan="3" style="text-indent:2em" | 60(50)# keV
| rowspan=2|3.6(2) min
| IT
| 98Rh
| rowspan=2|(5+)
| rowspan=2|
| rowspan=2|
|-
| β+
| 98Ru
|-
| 99Rh
| style="text-align:right" | 45
| style="text-align:right" | 54
| 98.908132(8)
| 16.1(2) d
| β+
| 99Ru
| 1/2−
|
|
|-
| rowspan=2 style="text-indent:1em" | 99mRh
| rowspan=2 colspan="3" style="text-indent:2em" | 64.3(4) keV
| rowspan=2|4.7(1) h
| β+ (99.83%)
| 99Ru
| rowspan=2|9/2+
| rowspan=2|
| rowspan=2|
|-
| IT (.16%)
| 99Rh
|- 
| 100Rh
| style="text-align:right" | 45
| style="text-align:right" | 55
| 99.908122(20)
| 20.8(1) h
| β+
| 100Ru
| 1−
|
|
|-
| rowspan=2 style="text-indent:1em" | 100m1Rh
| rowspan=2 colspan="3" style="text-indent:2em" | 107.6(2) keV
| rowspan=2|4.6(2) min
| IT (98.3%)
| 100Rh
| rowspan=2|(5+)
| rowspan=2|
| rowspan=2|
|-
| β+ (1.7%)
| 100Ru
|-
| style="text-indent:1em" | 100m2Rh
| colspan="3" style="text-indent:2em" | 74.78(2) keV
| 214.0(20) ns
|
|
| (2)+
|
|
|-
| style="text-indent:1em" | 100m3Rh
| colspan="3" style="text-indent:2em" | 112.0+X keV
| 130(10) ns
|
|
| (7+)
|
|
|-
| 101Rh
| style="text-align:right" | 45
| style="text-align:right" | 56
| 100.906164(18)
| 3.3(3) y
| EC
| 101Ru
| 1/2−
|
|
|-
| rowspan=2 style="text-indent:1em" | 101mRh
| rowspan=2 colspan="3" style="text-indent:2em" | 157.32(4) keV
| rowspan=2|4.34(1) d
| EC (93.6%)
| 101Ru
| rowspan=2|9/2+
| rowspan=2|
| rowspan=2|
|-
| IT (6.4%)
| 101Rh
|-
| rowspan=2|102Rh
| rowspan=2 style="text-align:right" | 45
| rowspan=2 style="text-align:right" | 57
| rowspan=2|101.906843(5)
| rowspan=2|207.0(15) d
| β+ (80%)
| 102Ru
| rowspan=2|(1−, 2−)
| rowspan=2|
| rowspan=2|
|-
| β− (20%)
| 102Pd
|-
| rowspan=2 style="text-indent:1em" | 102mRh
| rowspan=2 colspan="3" style="text-indent:2em" | 140.75(8) keV
| rowspan=2|3.742(10) y
| β+ (99.77%)
| 102Ru
| rowspan=2|6+
| rowspan=2|
| rowspan=2|
|-
| IT (.23%)
| 102Rh
|-
| 103Rh
| style="text-align:right" | 45
| style="text-align:right" | 58
| 102.905504(3)
| colspan=3 align=center|Stable
| 1/2−
| 1.0000
|
|-
| style="text-indent:1em" | 103mRh
| colspan="3" style="text-indent:2em" | 39.756(6) keV
| 56.114(9) min
| IT
| 103Rh
| 7/2+
|
|
|-
| rowspan=2|104Rh
| rowspan=2 style="text-align:right" | 45
| rowspan=2 style="text-align:right" | 59
| rowspan=2|103.906656(3)
| rowspan=2|42.3(4) s
| β− (99.55%)
| 104Pd
| rowspan=2|1+
| rowspan=2|
| rowspan=2|
|-
| β+ (.449%)
| 104Ru
|-
| style="text-indent:1em" | 104mRh
| colspan="3" style="text-indent:2em" | 128.967(4) keV
| 4.34(3) min
|
|
| 5+
|
|
|-
| 105Rh
| style="text-align:right" | 45
| style="text-align:right" | 60
| 104.905694(4)
| 35.36(6) h
| β−
| 105Pd
| 7/2+
|
|
|-
| rowspan=2 style="text-indent:1em" | 105mRh
| rowspan=2 colspan="3" style="text-indent:2em" | 129.781(4) keV
| rowspan=2|42.9(3) s
| IT
| 105Rh
| rowspan=2|1/2−
| rowspan=2|
| rowspan=2|
|-
| β−
| 105Pd
|- 
| 106Rh
| style="text-align:right" | 45
| style="text-align:right" | 61
| 105.907287(8)
| 29.80(8) s
| β−
| 106Pd
| 1+
|
|
|-
| style="text-indent:1em" | 106mRh
| colspan="3" style="text-indent:2em" | 136(12) keV
| 131(2) min
| β−
| 106Pd
| (6)+
|
|
|-
| 107Rh
| style="text-align:right" | 45
| style="text-align:right" | 62
| 106.906748(13)
| 21.7(4) min
| β−
| 107Pd
| 7/2+
|
|
|-
| style="text-indent:1em" | 107mRh
| colspan="3" style="text-indent:2em" | 268.36(4) keV
| >10 μs
|
|
| 1/2−
|
|
|-
| 108Rh
| style="text-align:right" | 45
| style="text-align:right" | 63
| 107.90873(11)
| 16.8(5) s
| β−
| 108Pd
| 1+
|
|
|-
| style="text-indent:1em" | 108mRh
| colspan="3" style="text-indent:2em" | −60(110) keV
| 6.0(3) min
| β−
| 108Pd
| (5)(+#)
|
|
|-
| 109Rh
| style="text-align:right" | 45
| style="text-align:right" | 64
| 108.908737(13)
| 80(2) s
| β−
| 109Pd
| 7/2+
|
|
|-
| 110Rh
| style="text-align:right" | 45
| style="text-align:right" | 65
| 109.91114(5)
| 28.5(15) s
| β−
| 110Pd
| (>3)(+#)
|
|
|-
| style="text-indent:1em" | 110mRh
| colspan="3" style="text-indent:2em" | −60(50) keV
| 3.2(2) s
| β−
| 110Pd
| 1+
|
|
|-
| 111Rh
| style="text-align:right" | 45
| style="text-align:right" | 66
| 110.91159(3)
| 11(1) s
| β−
| 111Pd
| (7/2+)
|
|
|-
| 112Rh
| style="text-align:right" | 45
| style="text-align:right" | 67
| 111.91439(6)
| 3.45(37) s
| β−
| 112Pd
| 1+
|
|
|-
| style="text-indent:1em" | 112mRh
| colspan="3" style="text-indent:2em" | 330(70) keV
| 6.73(15) s
| β−
| 112Pd
| (4, 5, 6)
|
|
|-
| 113Rh
| style="text-align:right" | 45
| style="text-align:right" | 68
| 112.91553(5)
| 2.80(12) s
| β−
| 113Pd
| (7/2+)
|
|
|-
| rowspan=2|114Rh
| rowspan=2 style="text-align:right" | 45
| rowspan=2 style="text-align:right" | 69
| rowspan=2|113.91881(12)
| rowspan=2|1.85(5) s
| β− (>99.9%)
| 114Pd
| rowspan=2|1+
| rowspan=2|
| rowspan=2|
|-
| β−, n (<.1%)
| 113Pd
|-
| style="text-indent:1em" | 114mRh
| colspan="3" style="text-indent:2em" | 200(150)# keV
| 1.85(5) s
| β−
| 114Pd
| (4, 5)
|
|
|-
| 115Rh
| style="text-align:right" | 45
| style="text-align:right" | 70
| 114.92033(9)
| 0.99(5) s
| β−
| 115Pd
| (7/2+)#
|
|
|-
| rowspan=2|116Rh
| rowspan=2 style="text-align:right" | 45
| rowspan=2 style="text-align:right" | 71
| rowspan=2|115.92406(15)
| rowspan=2|0.68(6) s
| β− (>99.9%)
| 116Pd
| rowspan=2|1+
| rowspan=2|
| rowspan=2|
|-
| β−, n (<.1%)
| 115Pd
|-
| style="text-indent:1em" | 116mRh
| colspan="3" style="text-indent:2em" | 200(150)# keV
| 570(50) ms
| β−
| 116Pd
| (6−)
|
|
|-
| 117Rh
| style="text-align:right" | 45
| style="text-align:right" | 72
| 116.92598(54)#
| 0.44(4) s
| β−
| 117Pd
| (7/2+)#
|
|
|-
| 118Rh
| style="text-align:right" | 45
| style="text-align:right" | 73
| 117.93007(54)#
| 310(30) ms
| β−
| 118Pd
| (4−10)(+#)
|
|
|-
| 119Rh
| style="text-align:right" | 45
| style="text-align:right" | 74
| 118.93211(64)#
| 300# ms[>300 ns]
| β−
| 119Pd
| 7/2+#
|
|
|-
| 120Rh
| style="text-align:right" | 45
| style="text-align:right" | 75
| 119.93641(64)#
| 200# ms[>300 ns]
| β−
| 120Pd
|
|
|
|-
| 121Rh
| style="text-align:right" | 45
| style="text-align:right" | 76
| 120.93872(97)#
| 100# ms[>300 ns]
| β−
| 121Pd
| 7/2+#
|
|
|-
| 122Rh
| style="text-align:right" | 45
| style="text-align:right" | 77
| 121.94321(75)#
| 50# ms[>300 ns]
|
|
|
|
|

References 

 Isotope masses from:

 Isotopic compositions and standard atomic masses from:

 Half-life, spin, and isomer data selected from the following sources.

 
Rhodium
Rhodium